The Men's 1500 metre freestyle competition at the 2019 World Championships was held on 27 and 28 July 2019.

Records
Prior to the competition, the existing world and championship records were as follows.

Results

Heats
The heats were started on 27 July at 11:17.

Final
The final was held on 28 July at 20:17.

References

Men's 1500 metre freestyle